The Daily World is a daily newspaper in Aberdeen, Washington, United States. Serving Grays Harbor County and northern Pacific County counties since 1889, The Daily World is the only daily newspaper on the coast of Washington state.

The newspaper first appeared as the Aberdeen Weekly Bulletin on July 31, 1889, almost three months before Washington achieved statehood.

In 1908, it was sold to Werner Andrew Rupp, a political reporter and editorial writer, and John F. Gilbert, a gifted cartoonist. The first edition appeared on Monday, June 1, 1908. They called it The Aberdeen Daily World for the first time on January 18, 1909. When Gilbert departed on January 4, 1910, Rupp became the sole proprietor, editor and publisher and was in control for the next 53 years. On March 2, 1969, it became The Daily World. The newspaper changed hands a few more times after that, but was purchased by Stephens Media in 1993. In 2014, The Daily World was sold to Sound Publishing, a subsidiary of Black Press.

As of 2013, its publisher was Bill Crawford, its editor was Doug Barker, and its circulation was 14,100.

Sister publications 
 The Montesano Vidette, Montesano (weekly, Thur)
 The North Coast News, Ocean Shores (weekly, Thur)

References

External links 
The Daily World official web site

Newspapers published in Washington (state)
Publications established in 1889